Alyth Catriona McCormack, better known mononymously as Alyth (born 1970) is a Scottish singer, songwriter and actress. She was brought up on the Isle of Lewis in the Scottish Outer Hebrides. In 2020 she has collaborated with the Art of Peace global project, composed and arranged by Mehran Alirezaei as vocalist.

Biography
As a young child in the 1970s, Alyth was immersed in the culture of Hebridean Scotland. She went on to study classical singing and drama at the RSAMD in Glasgow. Since then, she has worked on a string of collaborations, with folk, jazz, classical and indie musicians.

During this time she recorded with various artists, appearing on over 16 albums between then and 2007, and in 2000 released her début solo album An Iomall on Vertical records.

In 2004, she began touring with On Eagles' Wings, and toured again in 2007. Throughout 2007 and 2008, she performed worldwide with The Chieftains, appearing at venues such Boston Symphony Hall and Carnegie Hall. She toured with Moving Hearts during their UK Tour in 2008, and appeared at the Liverpool Philharmonic.

Alyth performed a concert for Sanctuary alongside Moya Brennan and Nóirín Ní Riain. She is a member of The Island Tapes, Shine and other bands. In 2009, Alyth released her second solo album, People Like Me, which featured members of the Scottish band Lau.

McCormack married Irish musician Noel Eccles in Aberdeenshire in 2009. Her wedding dress was specially designed and made from Harris Tweed.

Discography

Solo albums
 2000 – An Iomall
 2009 – People Like Me

Collaborations
 2002 – Sugarcane with Shine
 2004 – The Captain's Collection with The Captain's Collection
 2005 – On Eagles Wing
 2006 – Tha a laithean a’ dol seachad with Various Artists & Paul Mounsey
 2008 – The Island Tapes with The Island Tapes
 2007 – Sun Honey with Vertical Records artists
 2006 – Persian Nights/Celtic Dawn with Savourna Stevenson
 2008 – Dhachaigh (Home), The Murdo MacFarlane Songbook with Various artists

References

External links
Alyth's official website
Official Alyth Myspace Profile

Living people
Scottish folk singers
Scottish singer-songwriters
People from the Isle of Lewis
Date of birth missing (living people)
21st-century Scottish women singers
Vertical Records artists
20th-century Scottish women singers
1970 births